Resistance is a 1945 French drama film directed by André Berthomieu based on a novel by Pierre Nord.

It was known in France as Peloton d'exécution.

It was one of the most popular films of the year in France with admissions of 3,072,622.

References

External links
Resistance at IMDb

1945 films
Films directed by André Berthomieu
Films based on French novels
French black-and-white films
1945 drama films
French drama films
1940s French-language films
1940s French films